Forty countries have participated in the Junior Eurovision Song Contest since the first edition in 2003. Of these, twelve have won the contest and thirteen have hosted it. Organised by the European Broadcasting Union (EBU), the contest is held annually between the Union's members. Broadcasters from different countries submit songs to the event, and cast votes to determine the most popular in the competition.

Participation in the contest is primarily open to all active member broadcasters of the EBU. To be an active member, broadcasters must be a member of the European Broadcasting Union, or be in a Council of Europe member country. Eligibility to participate is not determined by geographic inclusion within the continent of Europe, despite the "Euro" in "Eurovision" — nor does it have a direct connection with the European Union. Several countries geographically outside the boundaries of Europe have competed: Cyprus, Armenia and Israel, in Western Asia, since 2003, 2007 and 2012 respectively; and Australia making a début in the 2015 contest. In addition, several transcontinental countries with only part of their territory in Europe have competed: Russia, since 2005; Georgia, since 2007; Azerbaijan, since 2012; and Kazakhstan, which made its first appearance in the 2018 edition. Australia, where the contest has been broadcast since 2003, débuted as a participant in the 2015 edition.

The Netherlands is the only country to have entered the contest each year since 2003, while Switzerland have only entered on one occasion, in 2004. Three countriesSlovakia, Monaco and Bosnia and Herzegovinahave announced their intention to enter the contest before withdrawing prior to their début.

Participants

The following table lists the countries that have participated in the contest at least once. Shading indicates countries that have withdrawn from the contest.

Switzerland participated in the contest once, in 2004. France, who also took part that year, returned to the contest in 2018. Denmark, the host country of the first contest in 2003, has not been at the contest since 2005, along with Norway, who also participated in 2003. Poland withdrew after the 2004 contest, due to placing last in both 2003 and 2004, but returned in 2016. United Kingdom withdrew from the contest in 2005, but returned in 2022. Spain, instead, withdrew one year later and returned in 2019. Croatia, the first winner of the contest, returned to the contest in 2014 after seven years out of the contest. However, the country placed last and withdrew again.

Serbia and Montenegro participated once in 2005, but dissolved in 2006. Serbia competed independently from the 2006 contest onwards. Montenegro made their debut as an independent nation in 2014.

The original Scandinavian broadcasters left the contest in 2006 because they found the treatment of the contestants unethical, and revived the MGP Nordic competition, which had not been produced since the Junior Eurovision Song Contest began. Sweden, however, returned to the contest the following year with a new broadcaster, TV4. TV4 did not participate in 2008, but returned in 2009. SVT returned to the contest in 2010, after TV4 withdrew earlier that year. Sweden's most recent participation was in 2014.

Belarus's broadcaster BTRC was expelled from the EBU in July 2021, preventing them from competing in future editions of the contest.

Other EBU members 
The following countries have been eligible to participate in the contest, but have never done so.

Participating countries in the decades
The tables list the participating countries in each decade since the first Junior Eurovision Song Contest was held in 2003.

Sixteen countries participated in the first contest. Since then, the number of entries has fluctuated, peaking at twenty in 2018 and dropping to a low of twelve in 2012, 2013 and 2020.

2000s

2010s

2020s

Other countries 
There have been a few unsuccessful attempts to participate in the Junior Eurovision Song Contest. For broadcasters to participate, they must be a member of the EBU and register their intention to compete before the deadline specified in the rules of that year's event. Each participating broadcaster pays a fee towards the organisation of the contest. Should a country withdraw from the contest after the deadline, they will still need to pay these fees, and may also incur a fine or temporary ban.

Bosnia and Herzegovina 
Bosnia and Herzegovina was one of the nineteen countries which applied to enter the Junior Eurovision Song Contest 2007. As there was a maximum number of eighteen countries permitted to perform, Georgia, the nineteenth country to apply, was unable to participate. However, on 21 June 2007, it was announced that Bosnia and Herzegovina had withdrawn from the contest, enabling Georgia to enter the contest. Once again in 2008, Bosnia and Herzegovina applied to make its debut at the contest along with Azerbaijan and Israel, but all three countries withdrew before the contest took place. It also remains only ex-Yugoslav country that has not participated in the contest yet.

Prior to 2007, Bosnia and Herzegovina had broadcast the Junior Eurovision Song Contest once in 2006. The contest was also broadcast live in Bosnia and Herzegovina in 2007, 2008 and 2009. In 2010 and 2011, BHRT organised a delayed broadcast of the contest.

Monaco 

Monaco and Monegasque broadcaster TMC expressed an interest in participating in the Junior Eurovision Song Contest 2005, however, plans did not come to fruition due to scheduling problems and harsh citizenship laws and thus they did not participate. They had stated an interest again to take part in Junior Eurovision Song Contest 2006, however at the end they did not take part in the contest.

Slovakia 
On 21 November 2002, Slovakia was drawn as one of the countries to participate in the Junior Eurovision Song Contest 2003, to be represented by Slovenská televízia (STV). However, Slovakia later announced that they would withdraw from the contest.

On 7 June 2019, according to Eurovision blog Eurofestivales, press spokesperson Erika Rusnáková for Slovak broadcaster Radio and Television of Slovakia (RTVS) stated that they were evaluating and supervising the possibility of débuting at the 2019 contest. However, on 10 June 2019, RTVS confirmed that they would not début in the 2019 contest.

In April 2021, the Slovak broadcaster Radio and Television of Slovakia (RTVS) confirmed that they had "not closed the door to the Junior Eurovision Song Contest 2021", signifying that they may possibly make their début. However, Slovakia later announced that they would not début in the 2021 contest in Paris.

Broadcast in non-participating countries

See also 
 List of countries in the Eurovision Song Contest
 List of countries in Eurovision Choir
 List of countries in the Eurovision Dance Contest
 List of countries in the Eurovision Young Dancers
 List of countries in the Eurovision Young Musicians

Notes

References

Countries

Junior Eurovision Song Contest

pl:Konkurs Piosenki Eurowizji dla Dzieci#Uczestnicy